Çeltikçi is a village in Anamur district of Mersin Province, Turkey. It is very close to the city of Anamur, which is west of Çeltikçi. The population of the village is 704 as of 2011. Like most other villages around, it is a dispersed settlement with greenhouse gardens and banana plantation within the village.

References

Villages in Anamur District